The 1946 Australian federal election was held in Australia on 28 September 1946. All 74 seats in the House of Representatives and 19 of the 36 seats in the Senate were up for election. The incumbent Labor Party led by Prime Minister Ben Chifley defeated the opposition Liberal–Country coalition, led by Robert Menzies. It was the Liberal Party's first federal election since its creation. This was the first time the Labor party had won a second consecutive election. This was also the last time the Labor party would win a federal election until the 1972 election.

The election was held in conjunction with three referendum questions, one of which was carried.

Results

House of Representatives

Notes
 Independent: Doris Blackburn (Bourke, Vic.)
 In South Australia, the Liberal Party was known as the Liberal and Country League.

Senate

Notes
 Of the three senators elected on Liberal–Country joint tickets, two were Liberal Party members and one was a Country Party member.

Seats changing hands

 Members listed in italics did not contest their seat at this election.

See also
 Candidates of the Australian federal election, 1946
 Members of the Australian House of Representatives, 1946–1949
 Members of the Australian Senate, 1947–1950

References
University of WA  election results in Australia since 1890
Two-party-preferred vote since 1937

Federal elections in Australia
1946 elections in Australia
September 1946 events in Australia
Aftermath of World War II in Australia